Netechma pecuniosa is a species of moth of the family Tortricidae. It is found in Peru.

The wingspan is 24 mm. The ground colour of the forewings is yellowish cream and is preserved as 
numerous rounded spots. The remaining area is brown. The hindwings are creamish, in the distal half of the wing it is strigulated (finely streaked) and reticulated (a net-like pattern) with pale brownish grey.

Etymology
The species name refers to the forewing maculation (spots) resembling coins and is derived from Latin pecunia (meaning money).

References

Moths described in 2010
Netechma